In the 1990 Monte Carlo Open doubles, Tomáš Šmíd and Mark Woodforde were the defending champions, but Woodforde did not participate this year.  Šmíd partnered Petr Korda.

Korda and Šmíd won the title, defeating Andrés Gómez and Javier Sánchez 6–4, 7–6 in the final.

Seeds
The top four seeded teams received byes into the second round.

Draw

Finals

Top half

Bottom half

External links
1990 Monte Carlo Open Doubles Draw

Doubles